The Frank A. Calderone Prize in Public Health is the most prestigious award in the field of public health. It is given every two years by the Columbia University Mailman School of Public Health to an individual who has made a "transformational contribution" in the field. The first Calderone Prize was awarded in 1992.

History
Established in 1986, the award is given  to an individual who has "accomplished work of extraordinary distinction in the field of public health or made a specific discovery or contribution that has had long-term national or global implications in such areas as communicable disease, environmental health, epidemiology, social and/or behavioral medicine, health policy, or any aspect of health promotion or disease prevention."

The prize is named after Dr. Frank A. Calderone, who after serving as the first deputy health commissioner of New York City from 1943 to 1946, became a leading figure in the World Health Organization (WHO) during its formative years. In 1947, under Dr. Calderone's direction as Medical Administrator at the headquarters of the World Health Organization, the newly-formed organization led a successful global cholera vaccination program.  The following year, as the WHO grew to include 58 member countries, Dr. Calderone became the organization's Chief Technical Liaison Officer. He was later appointed as Medical Director of the health service of the United Nations Secretariat, a position which he held from 1951 to 1954.

Entry and prize consideration

Candidates are nominated for The Frank A. Calderone Prize in Public Health by a select group of public health professionals. The award recipient is then chosen from among all nominees by a nine-member selection committee comprising, but not limited to, the following representatives:

 The current dean of the Mailman School of Public Health at Columbia University (chair of the committee)
 The president, or president-elect, of the Association of Schools of Public Health
 A representative from at least one prominent foundation
 A representative from the Centers for Disease Control and Prevention
 An editor of a prominent public health journal
 A previous prize winner
 A government representative (for example, the Commissioner of Health of the City of New York)
 Two representatives from the Calderone family

Laureates
Source: Columbia University Mailman School of Public Health

References

External links
Official website

Awards established in 1992
Awards and prizes of Columbia University